Cabin Pressure is a radio sitcom written and created by John Finnemore and directed and produced by David Tyler. It follows the exploits of the eccentric crew of the single aeroplane owned by "MJN Air" as they are chartered to take all manner of items, people or animals across the world. The show stars Finnemore, Stephanie Cole, Roger Allam and Benedict Cumberbatch.

The programme was first broadcast on BBC Radio 4 in 2008. Four series have been broadcast, along with a special 2010 Christmas Day episode. The show's finale, entitled "Zurich", was broadcast as a two-part special on 23 and 24 December 2014.

The series' opening music is Mikhail Glinka's Overture to Ruslan and Lyudmila.

Overview

Setting
The story takes place at MJN Air, the world's smallest airline, consisting of just one 16-seater plane: a "Lockheed McDonnell 312", registration Golf Echo Romeo Tango India (G-ERTI), and thus nicknamed "Gerti". The company name derives from when owner Carolyn Knapp-Shappey (Stephanie Cole) was awarded Gerti as part of her divorce settlement with her Australian husband Gordon Shappey (Timothy West) and thus proudly proclaimed that Gerti was: "My Jet Now". The company is so small, with Carolyn joking that rather than an airline MJN is more of an "airdot", that everything is run on a tight budget and they are willing to take on any job to keep the business going. The company is based in the fictional Fitton Airport, located somewhere in the Midlands.

Each episode is named after a different city (often a destination for MJN in the episode) each beginning with successive letters of the alphabet. The episodes were not broadcast in alphabetical order, but The Complete Cabin Pressure: From A to Z collection does play the episodes alphabetically.

Plot

The story follows the day-to-day working life of MJN Air and its crew of four: Carolyn (Stephanie Cole), the owner and stewardess; First Officer Douglas Richardson (Roger Allam), an experienced pilot formerly at Air England until he was sacked for smuggling; Captain Martin Crieff (Benedict Cumberbatch), whose love of flying and planes is let down by his lack of natural ability; and Arthur Shappey (John Finnemore), Carolyn's overexcited and idiotic (but well-meaning) son who works as a steward.

Much of the plot revolves around the relationship between Douglas and Martin. While Martin is the captain, Douglas is more experienced, and most people consider Douglas to be superior to him in almost every way. When meeting both men most guests mistakenly believe Douglas to be the captain rather than Martin. Carolyn refers to Douglas as the "good pilot" and Martin as the "safe pilot". Also, while Douglas gets paid, Martin does not because Carolyn cannot afford it. Thus Martin also has a second job with his own business, Icarus Removals, using a van he inherited from his late father, and lives a life of poverty.

Douglas, meanwhile, has to do his job in order to pay two different alimonies, and tries to keep secret from his third wife Helena that he is not a captain. It is later revealed that Helena is having an affair. Douglas is also a recovering alcoholic, having been sober for a period of several years at the time the story begins, although he tries to prevent anyone else from knowing about it, fearing it will tarnish his image.

Much of the time on the flight-deck is spent with the crew playing various games to pass the time such as "People Who Aren't Evil But Have Evil Sounding Names", "Brians of Britain", "Books That Sound More Interesting with the Final Letter Knocked Off" (e.g. Three Men in a Boa, Of Mice and Me) and "The Travelling Lemon", in which the crew try to hide a lemon in plain sight of the passengers without anyone complaining. This is the origin of the phrase "The lemon is in play," used by Douglas in the episodes Qikiqtarjuaq and Zurich Part 2.

Though MJN squabble among themselves, in several episodes the crew unite to combat a common enemy or problem. A recurring antagonist is Gordon Shappey (Timothy West), Carolyn's ex-husband and Arthur's father, who resents Carolyn obtaining the jet in the divorce and frequently tries to reacquire it through fair means and foul. Other recurring characters include Mr Birling (Geoffrey Whitehead), who every year hires the plane to take him to see the final match in the Six Nations Rugby Union tournament. On "Birling Day", the crew toady to Birling in the hope that he will give them all large tips. Every Birling Day Douglas attempts to steal Birling's whisky and sell it on while Carolyn and the rest of the crew try to stop him. In addition, Douglas and Martin, despite their personal differences and mutual animosity towards each other, also prove to be an effective and highly cooperative duo in some of the more dangerous situations. For example, in the episode 'St. Petersburg', when one of G-ERTI's engines fails, they successfully work together to pull off an emergency landing, thus saving Carolyn and Arthur's lives as well as their own, although Carolyn is typically less grateful than the two pilots would prefer.

Another recurring character is Captain Hercules "Herc" Shipwright (Anthony Head), a former colleague of Douglas who now works at Scottish airline Air Caledonia. Herc is an occasional rival to Douglas and a love interest to Carolyn, though she is reluctant to reciprocate Herc's affections.

Princess Theresa of Liechtenstein (Matilda Ziegler) appears in the final season, first appearing when she hires MJN to take her younger brother and ruling monarch King Maxi to Fitton so he can return to school. She and Martin begin a romantic relationship.

In the two-part series finale Martin is given a paid job at Swiss Air, which means MJN has to close down and Gerti has to be sold. However, when Gordon tries to purchase Gerti, Arthur puts in a gigantic bid to stop his father from buying the plane. Douglas suspects that there is something valuable hidden on the plane and MJN manage to buy back Gerti. His suspicions prove correct when he discovers that Gordon had replaced the wiring of the plane with gold, not expecting that Carolyn would get the plane in their divorce. Martin concludes he is a more skilled pilot than he thought, having been struggling in the past years with a poorly weighted plane, and the solution to Carolyn's financial problems has been right under her nose all along. Carolyn uses the money to secure the company's future, renaming it OJS Air ("Our Jet Still"). Martin takes up his new job securing paid employment and living close to Princess Theresa, Douglas is promoted to Captain, and Herc — who accepts a downwards career move due to his affections for Carolyn — is hired as the new First Officer. The series ends with OJS flying to Addis Ababa, bringing the alphabetical progression of cities full circle.

Reception
Writing in The Independent newspaper, Nicholas Lezard praised the first series highly, called "the writing and performances ... exceptional" and suggested that the show "deserves an award". Gillian Reynolds of The Daily Telegraph called Cabin Pressure "one of the best written, cast, acted and directed comedies on anywhere." Tom Eames of Digital Spy said "Finnemore should really be a household name by now. Not only does he play a hilarious character brilliantly, but his scriptwriting is up there with some of the best British comedy writers of all time." Jane Anderson of Radio Times called Cabin Pressure "the comedy series where the writing and acting are so tight they’re in danger of cutting off your blood supply."

Partly due to the popularity of leading actor Benedict Cumberbatch, the show has a significant fandom, and its final episode received a record number of requests for audience tickets for a Radio 4 comedy recording: 22,854 requests for just 200 available tickets. It has been argued that this is an example of the Odagiri effect occurring in western media.

Awards
Cabin Pressure was nominated for a Writers' Guild of Great Britain award in 2010. In 2011, John Finnemore won the Best Radio Comedy 2011, awarded by the Writers' Guild of Great Britain. It was nominated for the Best Scripted Comedy category at the 2012 BBC Audio Drama Awards. The series has won numerous Comedy.co.uk Awards, voted for by readers of the British Comedy Guide. The series won the award for "Best British Radio Sitcom" for 2011, 2013, and 2014. Also it was voted "Comedy of the Year" across TV and radio for 2014, making it the first radio show to be given the honour.

Episode list
The episode titles follow an alphabetical sequence, beginning with the first episode, "Abu Dhabi", followed by "Boston" etc. In Series 2 and 3 episodes were broadcast out of the original intended order for various reasons. The episodes however are listed in alphabetical order in The Complete Cabin Pressure: From A To Z collection, and Finnemore has stated that the series was always meant to be heard alphabetically.

Series one

Series two

Christmas special

Series three

Series four

Zurich

After Zurich
In 2018 and 2019 John Finnemore toured a live stage version of John Finnemore's Souvenir Programme. One sketch was an interview of Arthur Shappey in which he outlines the post-Cabin Pressure futures of the show's cast. These include Herc and Carolyn being married, Douglas remaining captain, and Martin and Princess Theresa's continuing relationship. Arthur is still working as cabin crew, but pretends in the sketch that he is studying and riding polar bears in Kuala Lumpur. 

Between March and August 2020, during the COVID-19 pandemic, Finnemore again revived the character of Arthur Shappey for a one-man online YouTube spin-off series called Cabin Fever! which takes the form of a 26-part online vlog by the character in quarantine and later lockdown. The other main Cabin Pressure characters are occasionally mentioned.

Multimedia
A number of CD releases for the show have been made by BBC Physical Audio and the production company Pozzitive.

References

External links

Finnemore's personal blog often discussing the series.

BBC Radio comedy programmes
BBC Radio 4 programmes
Aviation fiction
Aviation radio series